The Ungava magmatic event was a widespread magmatic event that began about 2.22 billion years ago during the Proterozoic Eon.

Extent 
Magmatic features that were formed during the Ungava magmatic event include the Klotz, Maguire and Senneterre dikes of Quebec and the Nipissing sills of Ontario.

References

Igneous petrology of Quebec
Igneous petrology of Ontario
Paleoproterozoic magmatism